Gallican may refer to:

 Gallican Church, a term referring to the Catholic Church in France
 Église gallicane, a Catholic denomination founded in 1869 by Hyacinthe Loyson
 Gallicanism, a doctrince that civil authority over the Catholic Church is comparable to that of the Pope
 Gallican Rite, a 1st-millennium Christian liturgy and other ritual practices in Western Christianity
 Gallican chant, the liturgical plainchant repertory of the Gallican rite
 Gallican, a largely obsolete synonym of Gallic, referring to:
 France, a country in Western Europe
 French people, the majority demographic group of France
 French language, the majority language of France
 Gallican, a largely obsolete synonym of Gaulish, referring to:
 Gaul, ancient nation encompassing modern-day France and parts of surrounding countries
 Gauls, the principal people of Gaul
 Gaulish language, spoken by the Gauls
 Roman Gaul, provincial rule of Gaul within the Roman Empire, 1st century BCE to 5th century CE

See also 
 Gallic (disambiguation)
 Gallica